Sam Gardiner (1940–2022) was a Northern Irish politician.

Sam Gardiner may also refer to:

Sam Gardiner (bowls) (1888–1968), English-born Canadian international lawn bowler
Sam Gardiner (poet) (1936–2016), Northern Irish poet and writer

See also
Samuel Gardiner (disambiguation)
Sam Gardner (disambiguation)